The bay antpitta (Grallaria capitalis) is a species of bird in the family Grallariidae. It is endemic to Peru.

Its natural habitats are subtropical or tropical moist montane forest and heavily degraded former forest.

References

bay antpitta
Birds of the Peruvian Andes
Endemic birds of Peru
bay antpitta
Taxonomy articles created by Polbot